Niphargus valachicus is a species of crustacean in family Niphargidae. This species of crustacean is native to  Bulgaria, Croatia, Hungary, Romania, Serbia and Montenegro, Slovakia, and Slovenia.

References

External links
 Niphargus Website - University of Ljubljana

Niphargidae
Crustaceans described in 1933
Taxonomy articles created by Polbot